Vijay may refer to:

People
Vijay (actor) (born 1974), an Indian Tamil actor
Vijay Sethupathi an Indian Tamil actor

Fiction
Vijay (1942 film), a 1942 Indian Hindi film
Vijay (1988 film), a 1988 Indian Hindi film directed by Yash Chopra
Vijay (1989 film), a 1989 Indian Telugu film directed by B. Gopal
Vijay (TV series), an NDTV Imagine television series

Military operations
Operation Vijay (1961)
Operation Vijay (1999)

See also
VJ (disambiguation)
Veejay (disambiguation)